Dhamtari is one of the 90 Legislative Assembly constituencies of Chhattisgarh state in India. It is in Dhamtari district.

Members of Legislative Assembly

Election results

2018

See also
List of constituencies of the Chhattisgarh Legislative Assembly
Dhamtari district
Dhamtari

References

Dhamtari district
Assembly constituencies of Chhattisgarh